Pind Dadn Khan railway station is located in Pind Dadan Khan, Jhelum district, Pakistan.

See also
 List of railway stations in Pakistan
 Pakistan Railways

References

External links

Railway stations in Jhelum District
Railway stations on Malakwal–Khushab branch line